Persewon stands for Persatuan Sepakbola Wondama (English: Football Association of Wondama) is an  Indonesian football club based in Teluk Wondama Regency, West Papua.  They currently compete in the Liga 3.

Supporter 
Wondamania is supporter of Persewon.

Ground 
No Ground at present. Matches played in Java. Home ground for 2009 season in AAU Stadium, Yogyakarta For 2010 season shared Diponogoro Stadium in Banyuwangi with Persewangi.

References

External links
Liga-Indonesia.co.id

Football clubs in Indonesia
Football clubs in West Papua (province)